Margaret II may refer to:

 Margaret II, Countess of Flanders (1202–1280), countess of Flanders and Hainaut, aka Margaret of Constantinople
 Margaret II, Countess of Hainault (1311–1356), Countess of Hainaut and Countess of Holland
 Margaret II, Countess Palatine of Burgundy (1350–1405), Countess of Flanders & Artois; Countess Palatine of Burgundy; Duchess of Burgundy
 Margrethe II of Denmark (born 1940), queen regnant of Denmark